Basiceros is a genus of ants in the subfamily Myrmicinae.

Species
 Basiceros conjugans Brown, 1974
 Basiceros convexiceps (Mayr, 1887)
 Basiceros disciger (Mayr, 1887)
 Basiceros manni Brown & Kempf, 1960
 Basiceros militaris (Weber, 1950)
 Basiceros redux (Donisthorpe, 1939)
 Basiceros scambognathus (Brown, 1949)
 Basiceros singularis (Smith, 1858)

References

External links

Myrmicinae
Ant genera